Kadar (Dargwa: Къадар) is a rural locality in the Buynaksky District of the Republic of Dagestan in Russia. It was one of four villages under the control of the Islamic Djamaat of Dagestan between 1998 and 1999.

Geography
Kadar is located 28 km southeast of the regional capital of Buynaksk, in the southeastern part of the Buynaksky District. Its highest point is 1,536 meters above sea level. Kadar is bordered to the west by the rural locality of Karamakhi, to the north by Chankurbe and Vanashimahi, in the northeast by Kachkalykom, and in the south and southeast by the Chonkatau Ridge.

History
Kadar was capital of Kadar state of Akusha-Dargo confederacy. Kadar was a stronghold that provided protection for several villages. It also expanded into Kumuk lands. In 14th century Tamerlan invaded North Caucausus and destroyed Kadar castle. It took Kadar several centuries to recover. In 19th century when Akusha-Dargo seized its existence Kadar joined Russian empire.

References

Rural localities in Buynaksky District